Pandit Cashinath Kistoe Aryan Vedic Hindu Aided School is a primary school in Vacoas-Phoenix, Mauritius. It is more commonly known as P.C.K. Aryan Vedic School or Aryan Vedic School. 

The institution offers education to children up to the Certificate of Primary Education (CPE). 

It was founded in 1918 by Pandit Cashinath Kistoe with the assistance of Chirinjiv Bhardwaz, Swami Swatantranand and other social workers. It forms part of the socio-cultural movement broadly known as Arya Samaj in Mauritius.

References

External links
 PCK Aryan Vedic Hindu Aided School Facebook site

Schools in Mauritius
Hindu schools in Mauritius